Danilia discordata is a species of sea snail, a marine gastropod mollusk in the family Chilodontidae.

Description

Distribution
This species occurs in the western Pacific Ocean.

References

External links

discordata
Gastropods described in 2005